Hercules and Antaeus is a 1531 oil painting by the German artist Hans Baldung. It was donated in 1892 by Edward Habich to the Gemäldegalerie Alte Meister (Kassel) in Germany, where it still hangs.

The work depicts the fight to the death between the bearded hero Hercules and the giant Antaeus, which occurred during Hercules' 11th labour, the stealing of the Apples of the Hesperides. Antaeus challenged and fought all strangers, killing every one, being invincible as long as he remained in contact with his mother, Gaia (The Earth). Hercules therefore lifted him off the ground and crushed him to death in a bearhug. Witness the blood seeping from Antaeus' ear. The incongruous paw of Hercules' lionskin cloak was added in later years in the interests of propriety.

Sources

1531 paintings
Paintings by Hans Baldung
Paintings in the collection of the Gemäldegalerie Alte Meister (Kassel)
Paintings depicting Heracles